Luciano Pezzi (7 February 1921, Russi, Province of Ravenna – 26 June 1998) was an Italian professional road bicycle racer. He was born in Russi and died in Bologna at age 77.

Major results

1955
Tour de France:
Winner stage 15

External links 

Official Tour de France results for Luciano Pezzi

1921 births
1998 deaths
People from Russi
Italian male cyclists
Italian Tour de France stage winners
Cyclists from Emilia-Romagna
Sportspeople from the Province of Ravenna